Senuma (written: 瀬沼) is a Japanese surname. Notable people with the surname include:

Senuma Kayō, (瀬沼夏葉, 1897  1915), Japanese translator
, Japanese footballer
, Japanese footballer

Japanese-language surnames